FGV Holdings Berhad (Abbreviation: FGV, sometimes FGVH; or formerly 
Felda Global Ventures Holdings Berhad) is a Malaysian-based global agribusiness and food company. It is an affiliate of the Federal Land Development Authority (FELDA).

With operations worldwide, FGV produces oil palm and rubber products, oleochemicals and sugar products, with materials sourced from FELDA colonies throughout the country.

Background
Its initial public offering in 2012 was the third largest in the world that year after Facebook and biggest IPO in Asia which raised USD 3.1 billion.

It is the third largest palm oil company in the world by planted acreage. FGV manages a total land bank of 439,230 hectares in Malaysia and Indonesia including land under Land Lease Agreement (LLA) with Felda. The company produces approximately 3 million metric tonnes (MT) of CPO annually.

In 2009, FGV purchased 51% of the largest sugar refiner in Malaysia, MSM Malaysia Holdings from PPB Group Berhad (founded by Robert Kuok) for RM1.25 billion.

On July 3, 2018, the company dropped the phrase "Felda Global Ventures" from their corporate name and renamed as FGV Holdings Berhad.

US sanctions
On 1 October 2020, the company's products were banned by U.S. Customs and Border Protection, citing forced labour and human rights abuses, including "physical and sexual abuse, debt bondage and abusive conditions."

Notes

References

External links
 

Conglomerate companies of Malaysia
Government-owned companies of Malaysia
Agriculture companies of Malaysia
Palm oil companies of Malaysia
Malaysian companies established in 2007
Agriculture companies established in 2007
Companies listed on Bursa Malaysia